"H." is a song by the American rock band Tool. The song was released as the second single from their second album, Ænima on March 19, 1997. "H." reached number 23 on the US Mainstream Rock Tracks chart.

The working title for the song was "Half Empty", and thus "H." most likely stands for that or "Half Full". During several tours, the lead singer of Tool, Maynard James Keenan, has referenced his son, whose middle name is H, just before performances of this song.

However, on several occasions, specifically on November 23, 1996 during a show at the Electric Factory in Philadelphia, Maynard James Keenan granted some insight into another meaning of the song, saying:
"So, any of you ever watched those Warner Bros. cartoons? Sometimes there's that one where that guy is having a tough time trying to make a decision. He's got an angel on one shoulder and the devil on the other. Seems pretty obvious, right? Usually it's the angel who is kind of the one trying to give him the good advice while the devil is trying to get him to do what's bad for him. It's not always that simple though. Most times they're not really angels or devils. They're just friends giving you advice, looking out for your best interest but not really understanding what's going to be best for you. So it kind of comes down to you. You have to make the decision yourself... This song is called H."

Track listing

Chart performance

References

1996 songs
1997 singles
Tool (band) songs
Volcano Entertainment singles
Songs written by Maynard James Keenan
Songs written by Danny Carey
Songs written by Justin Chancellor
Songs written by Adam Jones (musician)